Raffaele Filippo Presutti OFM Cap. (8 January 1845 – 3 August 1914) was an Italian Bishop and Missionary who served as the Apostolic Vicar of Arabia from 13 September 1910 to 3 August 1914, he also served as the Titular Bishop of Anchial.

Life 
On 13 September 1910, Pope Pius X appointed Presutti Apostolic Vicar of Arabia and Titular Bishop of Anchial. On 30 November 1910, he was consecrated bishop by the Archbishop of Agra, Carlo Giuseppe Gentili, OFM Cap. The co-consecrators were Bishop of Allahabad, Petronio Francesco Gramigna OFM Cap, and Bishop of Lahore, Fabien Antoine Eestermans OFM Cap.

Death 
Presutti died in Keren, Italian Eritrea, on 3 August 1914.

References 

 

Bishops appointed by Pope Pius X
1845 births
1914 deaths
People from the Province of Macerata
20th-century Italian Roman Catholic archbishops
Apostolic vicars
Capuchin bishops
Roman Catholic missionaries in India
Roman Catholic bishops in the Middle East
Catholic missionaries in Arabia
Apostolic Vicariate of Arabia
Catholic Church in the Arabian Peninsula